1980 Paralympics may refer to:
1980 Summer Paralympics
1980 Winter Paralympics